The Carbon County Jail is a historic jail located in Jim Thorpe, Carbon County, Pennsylvania.

History
The jail was built in 1869–1870 by Harry Bowman (under architect Edward Haviland) and is a two-story, fortress-like rusticated stone building. It has thick, massive walls and a square, one-story guard turret above the main entrance. It features arched windows on the main facade and on the turret. There is a basement which was used for solitary confinement until 1980. The building is most notable as the jail where a number of suspected "Molly Maguires" were imprisoned while awaiting trial in 1875–1876 and subsequently hanged.

It was added to the National Register of Historic Places on November 8, 1974. It is located in the Old Mauch Chunk Historic District.

On January 23, 1995, following the completion and opening of the new $8.2 million Carbon County Correctional Facility in Nesquehoning, the prisoners were transferred out of the jail to the new facility.

Museum

When the county put the jail up for sale in the fall of 1994, local residents Thomas McBride and wife Betty Lou purchased the building for $160,000 with the goal of preserving the local history. The building is now operated as the Old Jail Museum with seasonal tours. In cell 17, there is a handprint left by Alexander Campbell, a "Molly Maguire" who was hanged in 1877, to proclaim his innocence. Legend has it that despite many attempts to remove it, including building a new wall, the mark still remains today.

See also
 National Register of Historic Places listings in Carbon County, Pennsylvania
 Murder of workers in labor disputes in the United States
 Coal and Iron Police

References

External links
 Old Jail Museum

Jails on the National Register of Historic Places in Pennsylvania
Government buildings completed in 1869
Museums in Carbon County, Pennsylvania
History museums in Pennsylvania
Prison museums in the United States
1869 establishments in Pennsylvania
National Register of Historic Places in Carbon County, Pennsylvania
Jails in Pennsylvania